A Humdrum Star is the fourth studio album by the English band GoGo Penguin. It was released in February 2018 by Blue Note Records.

Track listing

Charts

References

2018 albums
GoGo Penguin albums
Blue Note Records albums